In graph theory, a clustering coefficient is a measure of the degree to which nodes in a graph tend to cluster together. Evidence suggests that in most real-world networks, and in particular social networks, nodes tend to create tightly knit groups characterised by a relatively high density of ties; this likelihood tends to be greater than the average probability of a tie randomly established between two nodes (Holland and Leinhardt, 1971; Watts and Strogatz, 1998).

Two versions of this measure exist: the global and the local. The global version was designed to give an overall indication of the clustering in the network, whereas the local gives an indication of the embeddedness of single nodes.

Local clustering coefficient  
 The local clustering coefficient of a vertex (node) in a graph quantifies how close its neighbours are to being a clique (complete graph). Duncan J. Watts and Steven Strogatz introduced the measure in 1998 to determine whether a graph is a small-world network.

A graph  formally consists of a set of vertices  and a set of edges  between them. An edge  connects vertex  with vertex .

The neighbourhood   for a vertex  is defined as its immediately connected neighbours as follows:

 

We define  as the number of vertices, in the neighbourhood, of a vertex.

The local clustering coefficient  for a vertex  is then given by a proportion of the number of links between the vertices within its neighbourhood divided by the number of links that could possibly exist between them. Thus, the local clustering coefficient for directed graphs is given as 

 

Therefore, if a vertex  has  neighbours,  edges could exist among the vertices within the neighbourhood. Thus, the local clustering coefficient for undirected graphs can be defined as

 

Then we can also define the clustering coefficient as

 

It is simple to show that the two preceding definitions are the same, since

 

Since any graph is fully specified by its adjacency matrix A, the local clustering coefficient for a simple undirected graph can be expressed in terms of A as:

where:

and Ci=0 when ki is zero or one. In the above expression, the numerator counts twice the number of complete triangles that vertex i is involved in. In the denominator, ki2 counts the number of edge pairs that vertex i is involved in plus the number of single edges traversed twice. ki is the number of edges connected to vertex i, and subtracting ki then removes the latter, leaving only a set of edge pairs that could conceivably be connected into triangles. For every such edge pair, there will be another edge pair which could form the same triangle, so the denominator counts twice the number of conceivable triangles that vertex i could be involved in.

Global clustering coefficient 
The global clustering coefficient is based on triplets of nodes. A triplet is three nodes that are connected by either two (open triplet) or three (closed triplet) undirected ties. A triangle graph therefore includes three closed triplets, one centered on each of the nodes (n.b. this means the three triplets in a triangle come from overlapping selections of nodes). The global clustering coefficient is the number of closed triplets (or 3 x triangles) over the total number of triplets (both open and closed). The first attempt to measure it was made by Luce and Perry (1949). This measure gives an indication of the clustering in the whole network (global), and can be applied to both undirected and directed networks (often called transitivity, see Wasserman and Faust, 1994, page 243).

The global clustering coefficient is defined as:

 .

The number of closed triplets has also been referred to as 3 × triangles in the literature, so:

 .

A generalisation to weighted networks was proposed by Opsahl and Panzarasa (2009), and a redefinition to two-mode networks (both binary and weighted) by Opsahl (2009).

Since any graph is fully specified by its adjacency matrix A, the global clustering coefficient for an undirected graph can be expressed in terms of A as:

where:

and C=0 when the denominator is zero.

Network average clustering coefficient 
As an alternative to the global clustering coefficient, the overall level of clustering in a network is measured by Watts and Strogatz as the average of the local clustering coefficients of all the vertices  :

 

It is worth noting that this metric places more weight on the low degree nodes, while the transitivity ratio places more weight on the high degree nodes.

A generalisation to weighted networks was proposed by Barrat et al. (2004), and a redefinition to bipartite graphs (also called two-mode networks) by Latapy et al. (2008) and Opsahl (2009).

Alternative generalisations to weighted and directed graphs have been provided by Fagiolo (2007) and Clemente and Grassi (2018).

This formula is not, by default, defined for graphs with isolated vertices; see Kaiser (2008) and Barmpoutis et al. The networks with the largest possible average clustering coefficient are found to have a modular structure, and at the same time, they have the smallest possible average distance among the different nodes.

Percolation of clustered networks

In networks with low clustering, the critical point gets scaled by  such that:

This indicates that for a given degree distribution, the clustering leads to a larger percolation threshold, mainly because for a fixed number of links, the clustering structure reinforces the core of the network with the price of diluting the global connections. For networks with high clustering, strong clustering could induce the core–periphery structure, in which the core and periphery might percolate at different critical points, and the above approximate treatment is not applicable.

For studying the robustness of clustered networks a percolation approach is developed.

See also
Directed graph
Graph theory
Network theory
Network science
Percolation theory
Scale free network
Small world

References

External links

Graph invariants
Algebraic graph theory
Network theory
Network analysis